The Fr.Agostino Vicini's Special School is a school for hearing impaired students in Mundamveli, Kerala, India. Founded in 1995, and managed by the Diocese of Cochin, it is the only one of its kind in West Kochi.

Sources 
  referenced 24 January 2005

Schools for the deaf in India
Christian schools in Kerala
Schools in Kochi
Educational institutions established in 1995
1995 establishments in Kerala